Atlantis is a city in Palm Beach County, Florida, United States. As of the 2020 census, the city had a population of 2,142.

Geography

It  borders the Lake Worth Drainage (L-14) Canal on the north, Lantana Road to the south, Military Trail to the west and Congress Avenue to the east.

History
The modern history of what became known as the city of Atlantis originates in a ranch called Mulberry Farms, owned by Philip D. Lewis, a former Florida state senator. Lewis's Mission Company raised Brahman cattle on the land.  In 1958, real estate developers Nathan Hunt and Paul Kintz purchased the land, and began the construction of what became a gated golf and country club community.  The residential development, combined with a small amount of adjacent land for commercial use, was incorporated on June 19, 1959. Its first council was appointed, consisting of James Kintz as mayor, Nathan Hunt as vice mayor, and councilmen Paul Kintz, Marjorie Hunt and William Blakeslee.

Demographics

2020 census

As of the 2020 United States census, there were 2,142 people, 888 households, and 548 families residing in the city.

2010 census
At the 2010 census there were 2,083 people in 1,024 households, including 677 families, in the city. The population density was 1,462.9 inhabitants per square mile (565.1/km). The racial makeup of the city was 97.11% White (94.6% were Non-Hispanic), 2.00% Asian, 0.50% African American, 0.20% from other races, and 0.20% from two or more races. Hispanic or Latino of any race were 2.59%.

Of the 1,024 households 8.8% had children under the age of 18 living with them, 61.8% were married couples living together, 3.7% had a female householder with no husband present, and 33.8% were non-families. 29.7% of households were one person and 23.0% were one person aged 65 or older. The average household size was 1.96 and the average family size was 2.36.

The age distribution was 8.6% under the age of 18, 2.4% from 18 to 24, 10.8% from 25 to 44, 27.0% from 45 to 64, and 51.2% 65 or older. The median age was 66 years. For every 100 females, there were 86.7 males. For every 100 females age 18 and over, there were 86.1 males.

The median household income was $71,019 and the median family income  was $82,807. Males had a median income of $38,906 versus $47,188 for females. The per capita income for the city was $47,614, among the state's top fifty. About 4.8% of families and 4.0% of the population were below the poverty line, including none of those under age 18 and 3.8% of those age 65 or over.

As of 2000, speakers of English accounted for 97.94% of all residents, while Spanish was the mother tongue of 2.05% of the population.

As of 2000, Atlantis had the 126th highest percentage of Cuban residents in the US, with 1.70% of the populace. It had the sixteenth highest percentage of Syrian residents in the US, at 1.20% of the city's population, and the tenth highest percentage of Australian residents in the US, at 1.10% of its population (tied with Mad River, Ohio, Lebanon, Maine and Gilmer, Illinois.)

Economy
Atlantis is home to JFK Medical Center, site of the first reported case that turned out to be part of the 2001 anthrax attacks. It is the largest employer in Atlantis.

References 

Cities in Palm Beach County, Florida
Populated places established in 1959
Planned cities in the United States
Cities in Florida
Planned communities in Florida
1959 establishments in Florida